Overground may refer to:

Transport
 London Overground, the official brand name of a London suburban railway run by Transport for London since 2007
 By analogy, a commuter rail network in general
 "Overground" trains, an informal, colloquial term for National Rail services in London, used to distinguish them from London Underground services
 Overground Network, a former temporary brand name for suburban railways in south London, UK, which is now defunct

Music
 Overground (band), a German boy band
 "Overground" (song), a single released by Siouxsie & the Banshees
 "Overground", a song released by Ruslana on her Wild Energy (album)

See also
Underground (disambiguation)